Balitang Southern Tagalog (a.k.a. GMA Regional TV Balitang Southern Tagalog) is a Philippine regional news broadcasting television show  broadcast by GMA Network in the Southern Tagalog region. It is currently presented by One of the News anchor Ivy Kristina Saunar-Gasang and Co-Anchor Ace Medrano. It premiered on February 14, 2022. The newscast airs Monday to Friday at 5:00 PM to 5:45 PM on GMA TV-12 Batangas and relayed to GMA TV-44 Jalajala, GMA TV-13 Occidental Mindoro, & GMA TV-7 Romblon.

Overview
Conceptualized by GMA Regional TV and GMA News and Public Affairs, the newscast, delivered in Filipino language, covers the significant and comprehensive news reports, making it the 2nd regional news program delivered in Filipino language after Balitang Amianan (now as One North Central Luzon). 
 
The newscast covers news and features in CALABARZON and MIMAROPA through the network's news teams from Batangas City and news stringers across the region. It also marks the debut of GMA Batangas as an originating station.
 
The newscast airs from Monday to Friday at 5:00 PM to 5:45 PM on GMA TV-12 Batangas and GMA Jalajala Rizal, Simulcast Via GMA Romblon and TV 13 Occidental Mindoro, with international broadcasts through GMA News TV.

History
GMA Network started to make preparations in building a regional hub for Southern Tagalog region in 2021 and conceptualized a newscast produced by GMA Regional TV and GMA News and Public Affairs. The launch of Balitang Southern Tagalog marked the debut of GMA Batangas as an originating station. GMA Batangas previously served as a relay station for GMA 7 Manila.

It became the second GMA Regional TV newscast in Southern Luzon, after Bicol Region's Balitang Bicolandia, which premiered a year earlier. The newscast covers news and features in CALABARZON and MIMAROPA through its news teams from Batangas City and news stringers across the region. It is the second regional news program delivered entirely in Filipino language after Balitang Amianan (now One North Central Luzon). Its opening billboard features the sceneries of the program's coverage area, only Batangas, Laguna, and Quezon. It is anchored by former TV Patrol Palawan anchor and CNN Philippines correspondent Ivy Saunar-Gasang and joined by Ace Medrano as Co-anchor together with Andrew Bernardo (from TV Patrol Southern Tagalog), Lorenzo Ilagan and Ilonah Manalo as the inaugural set of regional correspondents. Charm Ragiles from Balitang Bicolandia arrived later. Executive producer & supervising producer Dyan (pronounced "Dianne") Loquellano was also a correspondent of TV Patrol Southern Tagalog (Bernardo's colleague).

On April 29, 2022, GMA Batangas welcomed former TV Patrol Southern Tagalog host and correspondent Paul Hernandez (Bernardo's colleague in TV Patrol) on the newscast, replacing Ilonah Manalo. 

Saunar-Gasang of Balitang Southern Tagalog from GMA Batangas in (South Luzon) as the Part of One of the Top Remaining News Anchors of GMA Regional TV Newscasts Alongside are CJ Torida of One North Central Luzon from GMA Dagupan in (North Central Luzon), Jessie Cruzat of Balitang Bicolandia from GMA Naga in (Bicol Region), Alan Domingo of Balitang Bisdak from GMA Cebu in (Central and Eastern Visayas) Adrian Prietos of One Western Visayas from GMA Bacolod in (Western Visayas) and Sarah Hilomen-Velasco of One Mindanao from GMA Davao in (Mindanao).

During the Eleksyon 2022 Special Coverage on May 9-10, the newscast aired a special morning edition called Balitang Southern Tagalog Early Edition.

On June 20, 2022, GMA Batangas joins the rotation of GMA Regional TV stations across the country in hosting GTV's national morning newscast Regional TV News, Originally Anchor Saunar-Gasang and Medrano serving as Occasional anchor. This also marked the return of Ivy Saunar-Gasang to the national appearance after she left CNN Philippines.

On July 8, 2022, Russel Simorio, Balitang Amianan (now One North Central Luzon) news correspondent, was assigned by GMA Regional TV to make a brief reportorial stint with Balitang Southern Tagalog for 1 month. On August 22, 2022, Denise Hannah Mei Abante joined as a news correspondent for the newscast to replace Lorenzo Ilagan.

On September 5, 2022, on-screen graphics were updated across all GMA Regional TV produced newscasts.

Area of coverage
Batangas
Batangas City
Lipa City 
Laguna
San Pablo
Quezon
Lucena
Cavite
Tagaytay City
Rizal
Jalajala
Occidental Mindoro
San Jose
Oriental Mindoro
Calapan
Marinduque
Boac
Romblon
Odiongan

Personalities

Current
 Ivy Saunar-Gasang 
 Ace Medrano 
 Marjorie Padua 
 Andrew Bernardo 
 Paul Hernandez 
 Denise Hannah Mei Abante

Former
 Ilonah Riego-Manalo 
 Lorenzo Ilagan 
 Russel Simorio 
 Mark Lavarro 
 Dyan Loquellano

Segments
 Alerto (Police Reports)
 Bantay Panahon (Weather Reports)
 Bantay Bagyo (Typhoon Reports)
 Coronavirus Pandemic (COVID-19 Reports)
 Health Alert (Public Health Reports)
 Price Watch (Price Reports)
 Hayop sa Balita (Animal Reports)
 Balitang Barangay (Neighborhood Reports)
 Dengue Watch (Dengue Reports)
 Sports Synergy/GAME ON! (Sports Reports)
 Extra (Features)
 Spotlight (Showbiz Reports)
 Kwento ng Pilipino (Story Reports)
 Good News (Feature Reports)
 Kapuso Barangayan (Event Reports)
 GMA RTV Presents (Special Reports)
 #Spreadkindness (Profile Reports)
 Ala Eats (Food Reports)
 'Yan ang Pinoy! (Talented Reports)
 Sikat ka Ngay-on! (Viral News Reports)
 Tara na Di-ne! (Travel Reports)
 Balitang Agri (Agricultural Reports)
 Exclusive (Exclusive Reports)
 Kapuso sa Kalikasan (Environmental Reports)
 Pyesta! (Festival Reports)
 Showbits (Spotlight Reports)
 Kapuso sa Pasko (Christmas Reports)

References

External links

2022 Philippine television series debuts
GMA Network news shows
GMA Integrated News and Public Affairs shows
Philippine television news shows
Mass media in Batangas